Irina Yuryevna Levshakova (née Kuznetsova; Russian: Ирина Юрьевна Левшакова; 6 May 1959 – 31 January 2016) was a Russian paleontologist, geologist, artist and musician. She is most famous for her deep involvement in the underground rock music scene in Leningrad during the 1980s and 1990s.

As a paleontologist, Levshakova studied trionychid turtles and other reptiles. In 1986 she named a new extinct species of monitor lizard, Varanus darevskii. Levshakova also spent several years in Central Asia doing geological surveys. In 1984, Levshakova inherited the Linnik Dacha, a house in Komarovo previously owned by her grandfather , which she turned into a haven for rock musicians. Levshakova converted one of the rooms into a recording studio and regularly held parties there and allowed bands to play concerts. She rehearsed with several of the most famous local rock musicians of her time. In 1992 she survived a murder attempt by her then-boyfriend  of the band .

Levshakova was also a talented artist, creating cover art for many rock albums and having her artwork shown at exhibitions in both Russia and internationally. In 2010, she was arrested for having grown the largest ever plantation of Cannabis in northwestern Russia at her property, though she was sentenced only to five years probation. Levshakova died in 2016, aged 56, due to heart failure.

Background and early life 
Irina Yuryevna Kuznetsova was born in Leningrad (modern Saint Petersburg) on 6 May 1959. She was born into a family of academics; her mother was Irina Vladimirovna Linnik, an art historian specialized in Western European art. Her father, Yuri Ivanovich Kuznetsov, was also an art historian.

Linnik did not like small children since he thought they interfered with his work. As a result, Kuznetsova did not grow up in her family home, the Linnik Dacha in the village of Komarovo, instead living with her uncle Yuri Linnik (1915–1972). The younger Linnik was also an academic, a mathematician active in number theory, probability theory and mathematical statistics. Yuri's house was also a dacha in Komarovo, which he had built himself.

In her youth, Kuznetsova was considered a hippie, a lifestyle frowned upon in the Soviet Union. Her acquaintances later described her as beautiful but also unusual in that she smoked and sometimes used obscene language. After the intervention of some of the adults, she "corrected herself", getting married and in 1977 beginning to study at the Leningrad State University. Her first marriage was to Sergey Levshakov, with whom she at the age of eighteen had the twin sons Vladimir and Mikhail in 1977. For most of her adult life following the first marriage, she used the name Irina Levshakova.

Academic career 

Levshakova was a paleontologist and geologist. Levshakova studied under Lev Isaakovich Khosatzky, a well-known Soviet zoologist and paleontologist specialized in turtles. During her studies she wrote two unpublished student works (supervised by Khosatzky) on trionychid turtles, one on trionychids from Late Cretaceous Fergana (1980) and one on trionychids from Cretaceous and Paleogene Mongolia (1981). For her graduate thesis, Trionychids of the Cretaceous and Cenozoic of Middle Asia and Mongolia (1982), Levshakova sorted through and studied fossil bones collected by the renowned Soviet paleontologist Ivan Yefremov, material which had previously been studied by Khosatzky but never published. Based on some of the bones she examined, Levshakova named two new species of the softshell turtle Trionyx.

In 1986, Levshakova named a new species of fossil monitor lizard, Varanus darevskii, based on a relatively well-preserved skull from the Early Pliocene found near the village of Sor in Tajikistan. Levshakova believed V. darevskii to be the ancestor of the modern desert monitor (V. griseus). In a 2004 interview, Levshakova jokingly described her naming of species as placing her "on par with Linnaeus". In addition to her paleontological work, Levshakova also spent several years in Central Asia doing geological surveys before she permanently moved back to Komarovo.

Leningrad rock scene 

Levshakova was deeply involved in the underground rock scene in Leningrad in the 1980s and 1990s. After the death of her grandfather in 1984, Kuznetsova moved to the Linnik Dacha, which she turned into a haven for rock musicians from throughout Russia. Her address soon became an iconic address in the rock community. She turned one of the rooms into a recording studio and the house also began to function as a concert venue; she regularly held parties and organized apartment concerts. While active in the rock scene, Levshakova mostly went by the alias Komarovskaya or Linnik. She rehearsed with artists such as Boris Grebenshchikov and Konstantin Kinchev. One of Grebenshchikov's songs, "Аделаида" ("Adelaide"), was dedicated to Levshakova. Another regular visitor was Alexander Bashlachev, who for a time also lived in the dacha and who last visited in February 1988, five days before he committed suicide.

Levshakova was a talented artist. She frequently painted cover art for the albums of rock bands. Her watercolor art was at one point exhibited at the Oslo Museum in Norway. Some of her art was also at times exhibited at exhibitions in Leningrad. According to the author Olga Zhuk, Levshakova's art was characterized by being daring and extravagant. 

In early 1989 Levshakova was in England, where she recorded several programmes with the Russian-language BBC presenter Seva Novgorodsev, including a programme on 11 February in commemoration of Bashlachev and a programme on 25 February on the subject of Greenpeace and environmental issues. In the 25 February programme she was titled as both a paleontologist and an ecologist.  Levshakova also unsuccessfully attempted to realize a musical project of her own during her time in England.

She starred in the music video for the band's song "The Real Indian" (Песня о настоящем индейце). Their relationship came to an end in October 1992, when Chistyakov attempted to murder her. Reportedly believing that Levshakova was a witch and an "embodiment of evil", Chistyakov put on a painted ritual skirt and borrowed a "ritual knife" from a friend. While walking down a street with Levshakova at night, he suddenly grabbed her by the hair and began to saw her throat with the knife. Levshakova survived the attack since the knife was blunt and Chistyakov stopped immediately after blood began to flow. After he ran off, a neighbor found Levshakova in the street and asked what was happening, to which she reportedly responded "Don't you see, asshole!? I've been stabbed!" During his trial in court, Chistyakov to his own detriment attempted to defend himself by maintaining that Levshakova was a witch. Chistyakov was detained for a year at the Kresty Prison in Saint Petersburg and was then committed to a mental hospital for compulsory treatment for another year.

Cannabis arrest 

Levshakova was arrested on 14 September 2010 for growing Cannabis at her dacha. Her plantation was reported by the Federal Drug Control Service of Russia to have been the largest known in recent years and the largest ever Cannabis plantation in northwestern Russia; in total, over 1247 bushes were found, alongside around 600 grams of already dried "product" and large amounts that were still being dried. Levshakova made no attempt at hiding her guilt and also confessed to having consumed marijuana for a long time. While they were cutting it down, Levshakova is reported to have yelled out to the policemen to at least let the Cannabis ripen.

Levshakova was tried for the crime of storage and cultivation of drug-containing plants. Despite the size of the plantation, she received a generous sentence of five years probation, meaning that she could continue to live at home in the Linnik Dacha.

Personal life 
In 1993, Levshakova married for the second time, marrying Georgy Dmitrievich Orbeli, an artist and the son of a doctor. The couple had a son, Dmitry (born in 1994). Orbeli hanged himself in 1997, four years after their marriage. For most of her life, Levshakova lived at the Linnik Dacha in Komarovo, often with numerous animals. In 2004, she lived with a cat, five dogs and a small herd of Saanen goats whose milk she sold to the other villagers. Her mother stayed with Levshakova at times, until her death in 2009.

Opinions on Levshakova among the residents of Komarovo were sharply divided; some considered her an important and indispensable figure in the village whereas others (like Chistyakov had) derided her as a "witch", in large part due to the bad reputation her dacha had gathered during its time as a haven for rock music and drugs. Throughout her later years, she faced repeated harassment from ill-wishers. The most notable incident saw the killing of all but one of her dogs through poisoning their food. Levshakova also had a poor relationship with her eldest sons, who had grown up largely without her. At one point the twins apparently attempted to burn down her dacha. 

Levshakova did not watch television or read books, with the exception of the works of Kozma Prutkov, which she greatly enjoyed. She listened to the Echo of Moscow and Radio Liberty radio stations. In her later life, Levshakova largely stopped listening to Russian rock since it was "not very good", instead listening to the band Gipsy Kings and to Arabic music. She regularly received Arabic records from her brothers, one of whom worked in Kuwait and another who worked as an ambassador in Baghdad. Levshakova also enjoyed writing poetry.

Death and tribute 
Levshakova died of heart failure on 31 January 2016, aged 56. Two days before her death, she called her long-time friend Andrei Tropillo and asked him to accompany her to buy medicines. Though she told him that she was dying, Tropillo did not give it much thought since she had often said the same before. Tropillo and Levshakova often took walks together and bought food for her dogs.

The other half were scattered over the grave of one of her sons. The cannon ceremony was attended by numerous artists and bands formerly part of the Leningrad rock scene and coincided with a reunion festival of such artists and bands held in Saint Petersburg from 1 to 6 May. Among the attendees were Tropillo,  and his band ,  and his bands Avtomaticheskie udovletvoriteli and Atskiye Uskoriteli, and Pispiska Style, a group composed of several of Levshakova's former close associates.

See also 

 List of Russian Earth scientists
 List of Russian women artists

Notes

References 

1959 births
2016 deaths
Saint Petersburg State University alumni
Russian paleontologists
Russian women geologists
Soviet geologists
Soviet paleontologists
Russian women artists
Russian rock music